Paola Ampudia (born 5 August 1988) is a Colombian volleyball player. She is part of the Colombia women's national volleyball team. On club level she played for Liga Vallecaucana in 2015.

She played for the University of Missouri.

Clubs

References

External links 
 http://worldgrandprix.2015.fivb.com/en/preliminary-round-group3/competition/teams/col-colombia/players/paola-ampudia?id=45137
 http://voleiboldelperu.blogspot.com/2015/01/colombiana-paola-ampudia-es-nuevo-jale.html
 https://www.columbiamissourian.com/sports/ampudia-shines-for-missouri-volleyball-team/article_5cdc6c4f-d346-5686-b666-01aef43362c5.html
 http://www.fivb.org/vis_web/volley/WGP2015c/WGP2015c_p3-027.pdf

1988 births
Living people
Colombian women's volleyball players
Place of birth missing (living people)
Missouri Tigers women's volleyball players
Colombian expatriate sportspeople in the United States
Colombian expatriate sportspeople in Italy
Colombian expatriate sportspeople in Poland
Colombian expatriate sportspeople in Indonesia
Colombian expatriate sportspeople in Peru
Expatriate volleyball players in the United States
Expatriate volleyball players in Italy
Expatriate volleyball players in Azerbaijan
Expatriate volleyball players in Poland
Expatriate volleyball players in Indonesia
Expatriate volleyball players in Peru
Colombian expatriate sportspeople in Azerbaijan
21st-century Colombian women